Mabel's New Job is a 1914 film starring Mabel Normand and co-directed by Normand and George Nichols.

The film is presumed lost.

Cast
Mabel Normand
Chester Conklin
Charley Chase
Dave Anderson
Cecile Arnold
Dixie Chene
Alice Davenport
Dave Morris
Al St. John

References

External links

Madcap Mabel: Mabel Normand Website
Looking-for-Mabel
Mabel Normand Home Page

American silent short films
1914 films
1914 comedy films
1914 short films
American black-and-white films
American comedy short films
American drama films
1910s American films
Silent American drama films
Silent American comedy films